Sol de Mañana is a geothermal area in Sur Lípez Province in the Potosi Department of south-western Bolivia. It extends over 10 km2, between 4800m and 5000m in altitude.

This area is characterized by intense volcanic activity and the sulphur springs field is full of mud lakes and steam pools with boiling mud. Industrial logging was attempted at the end of the 1980s, but is uneconomic. There are still several wells, one of which emits pressurized steam, visible in the morning up to 50 meters high. The major mud lakes are located at 4850m. The field is seismically active.

Sol de Mañana, together with El Tatio, is among the geothermal fields located at high altitude and is associated with the volcanic system of the Altiplano-Puna volcanic complex, as well as with a fault system that connects the two. Sol de Mañana is part of the geothermal system of the Laguna Colorada caldera; Cerro Guacha and Pastos Grandes have been proposed to be the heat sources as well. This geothermal field has been investigated for the potential of geothermal power generation.

The region of Sol de Mañana is volcanic, with extensive exposure of Miocene-Pleistocene materials ranging from andesite to rhyodacite, as well as extensive faulting. Moraines also occur in the area.

Gallery

References

External links

 Sol de Mañana

Landforms of Bolivia
Landforms of Potosí Department
Tourist attractions in Potosí Department